Provincial Highway 27 is a Taiwanese highway that starts from Liouguei, Kaohsiung City and ends in Xinyuan, Pingtung, Pingtung County. The highway connects the inland townships in Kaohsiung and Pingtung to the southern coasts of Taiwan.

History
The highway was opened in 1992.

Route description
The highway begins at Laonong (荖濃) in Liouguei District, Kaohsiung, at the intersection with Highway 20. The highway continues along Laonong Creek and enters Pingtung County, passing through Gaoshu, Yanpu, and Changzhi. The road then enters downtown Pingtung City, before heading to the coastal regions. After passing through Wandan, the road ends at Xinyuan at the intersection with Highway 17.

Spur route
Provincial Highway 27a highway splits from its parent route in Liouguei, connecting the western settlements of Laonong Creek, before ending at Highway 28.

See also
 Highway system in Taiwan

References

External links

1992 establishments in Taiwan
Highways in Taiwan
Transportation in Kaohsiung
Transportation in Pingtung County